Burnside may refer to:

Places

Antarctica 
 Burnside Ridges, Oates Land

Australia 
 City of Burnside, a local government area of Adelaide, South Australia
 Burnside, South Australia, a suburb of the City of Burnside
 Burnside, New South Wales, in the Oatlands suburb of Sydney
 Burnside, Queensland, a suburb in the Sunshine Coast Region
 Burnside, Victoria, a suburb of Melbourne
 Burnside, Western Australia, in the South West region
 Lake Burnside, in the Gibson Desert, Western Australia

Canada 
 Burnside, Nova Scotia, an urban neighbourhood in Dartmouth, Nova Scotia
 Burnside Drive, a road in Dartmouth, Nova Scotia
 Burnside, Colchester County, an unincorporated rural community in Nova Scotia
 Burnside Hall, a building on the downtown campus of McGill University, Montreal, Quebec
 Burnside, Newfoundland and Labrador, a seaside town in Newfoundland
 Burnside, Ontario, in the township of  Severn
 Burnside River, Nunavut

New Zealand 
 Burnside, Christchurch, a suburb
 Burnside, Dunedin, a suburb

Northern Ireland 
 Burnside, County Antrim, a townland in County Antrim

Scotland 
 Burnside, South Lanarkshire, an area of Rutherglen
 Burnside, Highland, a district of Thurso
 Burnside of Duntrune, a hamlet in Angus

United States 
 Burnside, Arizona, a census-designated place
 Burnside, Chicago, a community area of Chicago, Illinois
 Burnside, Illinois, an unincorporated town in Hancock County
 Burnside, Iowa
 Burnside, Kentucky, a city in Pulaski County
 Burnside, Louisiana
 Burnside, Mississippi
 Burnside, Pennsylvania
 Burnside, Wisconsin, a town in Trempealeau County
 Burnside Bridge, a drawbridge in Portland, Oregon
 Burnside Skatepark, below Burnside Bridge
 Burnside Park, Providence, Rhode Island
 Burnside Street, a street in Portland, Oregon
 Burnside Township, Michigan
 Burnside Township, Clearfield County, Pennsylvania
 Burnside Township, Centre County, Pennsylvania
 Burnside Triangle, a district in Portland, Oregon

People with the surname 
 Adrian Burnside (born 1977), Australian baseball player
 Ambrose Burnside (1824–1881), American soldier, railroad executive, inventor, industrialist, and politician
 Bob Burnside, first president of the United States Lifesaving Association
 Brenda Burnside (born 1963), former boxing "journeywoman"
 Bruce Burnside (1833–1909), Chief Justice and Queen's Advocate of Ceylon
 Cara-Beth Burnside (born 1968), American skateboarder and snowboarder
 Cedric Burnside (born 1978), American electric blues drummer, guitarist, singer and songwriter
 David Burnside (born 1951), Northern Ireland politician and public relations expert
 Frank Herbert Burnside (1888–1935), pioneer airmail pilot
 Geoffery Burnside (born 1950), Bahamian cyclist
 George Burnside (American football) (1899–1962), blocking back in the National Football League
 George Burnside (Concerned Brethren) (1908–1994), New Zealand evangelist
 Iain Burnside, Scottish classical pianist, accompanist and radio presenter
 Joe Burnside (1930–2008), Britain's longest surviving heart transplant patient
 John Burnside (born 1955), Scottish writer
 John Burnside (inventor) (1916–2008), American inventor and gay rights activist, known for inventing the teleidoscope, darkfield kaleidoscope, and Symmetricon
 Jon Burnside, Canadian politician
 Julian Burnside (born 1949), Australian barrister, human rights and refugee advocate, and author
 Laurence Burnside (born 1946), Bahamian cyclist
 Maurice G. Burnside (1902–1991), professor, tobacco warehouse manager, and US Representative
 Pete Burnside (born 1930), baseball pitcher
 R. H. Burnside (1870–1952), actor, director, producer, composer, and playwright
 R. L. Burnside (1926–2005), blues musician
 Robert Burnside (1759–1826), English Baptist minister
 Robert Bruce Burnside (1862–1929), Australian judge
 Robert H. Burnside (1933–2021), American politician
 Sheldon Burnside (born 1954), Major League Baseball player
 Thomas Burnside (1782–1851), US Representative from Pennsylvania
 William Snow Burnside (1839–1920), Irish mathematician
 William Burnside (1852–1927), English mathematician
 Burnside's lemma, an orbit-counting theorem in group theory
 Burnside's problem, about whether certain groups must be finite
 Burnside's theorem, a proof that certain finite groups are solvable
 William Burnside (comics), a fictional incarnation of Captain America
  Michael Burnside (Paramedic), Husband, Father, all around good guy

Other uses 
 Burnside (TV series), a spin-off from The Bill

See also
 
 Burneside, a village in Cumbria, England
 Burnsides (disambiguation)
 Burntside (disambiguation)